Ballou is an unincorporated community located in the town of Morse, Ashland County, Wisconsin, United States. The community was established around 1890 by the Wisconsin Central railroad. It was named for Miner H. Ballou, the treasurer and general manager of the Menasha Paper Company and a director of the railroad.

Notes

Unincorporated communities in Ashland County, Wisconsin
Unincorporated communities in Wisconsin